Rashid Rauf Adam, better known by his stage name Adam Ro, is a Ghanaian-based recording artist, Business, Lifestyle, Artist A&R. Born in Ashaiman, Ghana. He is the CEO of Adam Ro Music.

Biography
Rashid Rauf Adam was born in Accra. He sings in his native language Dendi and Hausa, as well as English, Spanish and Twi. He also has been recognized internationally by western audiences.

Career 
Adam Ro was a participant at the maiden ACCES conference in 2017 in Dakar, Senegal. The ACCES conference is meant to engender collaborations and exchange of ideas between artists of African Music. Adam Ro attended the Music In Africa Access Conference in Kenya in 2018. The event which took place at Nairobi National Theater from 15 to 17 November 2018 saw some of the finest musicians and stakeholders in Africa gather to discuss the development of music and art on the continent.

Singles

References

Living people
1990 births
Ghanaian musicians

External links

 
Adam Ro on Twitter
Adam Ro on Facebook
Adam Ro on Instagram
Adam Ro on YouTube